Huai Thalaeng is a district (amphoe) in the eastern part of Nakhon Ratchasima province, northeastern Thailand.

History
Huai Thalaeng village was controlled by Tambon Ngio (ตำบลงิ้ว), Amphoe Phimai. It was upgraded to Tambon Huai Thalaeng in 1961 and became a minor district (king amphoe) later. It was upgraded to a full district in 1963.

Geography
Neighboring districts are (from the west clockwise): Chakkarat, Phimai, and Chum Phuang of Nakhon Ratchasima Province, and Lam Plai Mat and Nong Hong of Buriram province.

Administration
The district is divided into 10 sub-districts (tambons). The township (thesaban tambon) Huai Thlaeng covers parts of tambons Huai Thalaeng and Thap Sawai.

References 

Huai Thalaeng